Anton Gennadyevich Vorobyev (born 12 October 1990) is a Russian cyclist, who last rode for UCI Professional Continental team . In 2012, he became the World Under-23 time trial champion on a hilly course.

Major results

2008
 5th Overall Trofeo Karlsberg
 6th Time trial, UCI Juniors World Championships
2010
 Polska–Ukraina
1st Stages 3 & 4
 3rd Grand Prix of Moscow
 5th Duo Normand (with Vyacheslav Kuznetsov)
 7th Textielprijs
 8th Chrono Champenois
2011
 1st  Time trial, National Under-23 Road Championships
 1st Memorial Davide Fardelli
 3rd Chrono Champenois
 4th Time trial, UCI Under-23 Road World Championships
2012
 1st  Time trial, UCI Under-23 Road World Championships
 National Under-23 Road Championships
1st  Time trial
1st  Road race
 3rd Memorial Davide Fardelli
 4th Time trial, UEC European Under-23 Road Championships
 4th Duo Normand (with Sergey Chernetskiy)
2013
 1st Stage 1b (TTT) Settimana Internazionale di Coppi e Bartali
2014
 1st  Time trial, National Road Championships
 8th Time trial, UCI Road World Championships
2015
 2nd Overall Driedaagse van West-Vlaanderen
1st Prologue
 6th Time trial, European Games
 10th Overall Tour de l'Eurométropole
2016
 Circuit de la Sarthe
1st  Points classification
1st  Mountains classification
1st Stages 2b (ITT) & 3
 4th Time trial, National Road Championships
 10th Time trial, European Road Championships
2017
 3rd Time trial, National Road Championships
2018
 1st Prologue Five Rings of Moscow
 3rd Time trial, National Road Championships
2019
 2nd Time trial, National Road Championships
 7th Time trial, European Games

Grand Tour general classification results timeline

References

External links

1990 births
Living people
Russian male cyclists
People from Dmitrovsky District, Moscow Oblast
European Games competitors for Russia
Cyclists at the 2019 European Games
Sportspeople from Moscow Oblast